Michael Walter may refer to:
Michael Walter (American football) (born 1960), American football player
Michael Walter (luger) (1959–2016), East German luger
Mick Walter, English actor
Michael J. Walter,  American experimental petrologist

See also
Michael Walters (disambiguation)